James Alan Kenneth Caton (born 4 January 1994) is an English footballer who plays as a winger for  club Nantwich Town.

He has played in the Football League for Blackpool, Accrington Stanley and Shrewsbury Town.

Early life and career
Caton was born in Widnes, where he attended Wade Deacon High School. As well as football, he played rugby league at school, and was a member of his Year 10 team that reached the Champion Schools final at Twickenham in 2009. Caton played football for boys' team Widnes Wolves before joining Bolton Wanderers as a nine-year-old schoolboy. He was a part of the England U16s setup that won the Victory shield and turned professional with Bolton in 2010, but was released in the summer of 2012. After a trial with Derby County, Caton scored against Everton in Keith Southern's testimonial match as part of a successful trial with Blackpool.

Club career

Blackpool
Caton signed a two-year contract with Football League Championship club Blackpool, with the option of a third year, in August 2012. He said his move to Blackpool was motivated by the club's playing style. Named twice on the bench in his first year, against Cardiff City and Watford, his senior debut came on 31 August 2013, as a late substitute for Nathan Delfouneso in a 1–0 win against Watford.

He joined League Two club Accrington Stanley on a month's loan in October 2013, and made his debut in a 2–1 loss against Dagenham & Redbridge, coming on as a substitute for Nicky Hunt in the 59th minute. However, his loan was cut short due to injury. In March 2014, he went on loan again, to Conference Premier club Chester until the end of the season. He scored on his debut, having come on as a half-time substitute against Grimsby Town, but made no more appearances for the club.

At the end of the 2013–14 season, Caton was released.

Shrewsbury Town
Following his release by Blackpool, Caton joined Shrewsbury Town on a free transfer in  June 2014. He made his league debut as a 57th-minute substitute for Ashley Vincent in a 2–1 win over Tranmere Rovers on 16 August 2014.>

Having only been on the fringes of the first-team squad, he went on loan to Southport in January 2015. After returning to his parent club, he captained a young Shrewsbury side to victory over local rivals AFC Telford United in the Shropshire Senior Cup final, also scoring the opening goal in a 3–1 win.

Just prior to the start of the following season, Caton joined League Two club Mansfield Town on a one-month loan, during which he made a single appearance in the League Cup. In November 2015, he signed for Wrexham of the National League on loan until January. On his return to Shrewsbury, he made another loan move, to another National League club, Lincoln City, for the rest of the season.

Caton was released by Shrewsbury Town when his contract expired.

Non-league career
Caton joined up once again with Lincoln City in the following pre-season with a view to earning a permanent deal, but was unable to agree terms. He signed a six-month contract with National League club Southport in August 2016. His 23 league appearances produced two goalsa consolation in a 4–1 defeat to Barrow, and the winning goal at Torquay United,and his contract was not renewed.

Caton joined National League rivals Dover Athletic on 2 February 2017 for what remained of the season. He played twice, in the quarter-final and semi-final of the Kent Senior Cup, and scored in each match, but made no league appearances.

Following his release from Dover, Caton signed a two-year contract with National League North club Darlington on 17 July 2017. In the 2018–19 season, he spent time on loan to Northern Premier League clubs Warrington Town and Stalybridge Celtic. He left Darlington by mutual consent in January 2019, and finished the season with Nuneaton Borough.

Alongside his football career, Caton studied for a BA degree in football coaching and management with UCFB, which he completed in 2021. He then rejoined Dover Athletic. Caton was released after one season following relegation.

On 3 September 2022, Caton joined National League North club Hereford; he was released three months later, subsequently joining Nantwich Town.

Career statistics

References

External links

1994 births
Living people
Footballers from Widnes
English footballers
Association football wingers
Bolton Wanderers F.C. players
Blackpool F.C. players
Accrington Stanley F.C. players
Chester F.C. players
Shrewsbury Town F.C. players
Southport F.C. players
Mansfield Town F.C. players
Wrexham A.F.C. players
Lincoln City F.C. players
Darlington F.C. players
Warrington Town F.C. players
Stalybridge Celtic F.C. players
Nuneaton Borough F.C. players
Dover Athletic F.C. players
Hereford F.C. players
Nantwich Town F.C. players
English Football League players
National League (English football) players
Northern Premier League players